Glance may refer to:

 Eye contact, a behavioral event related to vision
 USS Glance (1863), a Union Navy steamship during the American Civil War
 Glance, several minerals, including:
 Antimony glance (Stibnite)
 Bismuth glance (Bismutite)
 Cobalt glance (Cobaltite)
 Copper glance (Chalcocite)
 Iron glance (Hematite)
 Lead glance (Galena)
 Molybdenum glance (Molybdenite)
 Silver glance (Argentite)
 Glance (album), an album by Rose Kemp
 Glance, OpenStack's image service
 Glance (company), Indian software and content company

People with the surname
 Harvey Glance (born 1957), American track athlete
 Stephanie Glance, American basketball coach

See also 
 Glancy